Visby Airport , is located about  north of Visby, Gotland, Sweden.

Visby airport is Gotland's only commercial airport and the 12th largest airport in Sweden. The airport had 463,616 passengers in 2016. The traffic has a large seasonal variation with many more passengers in the summer; in 2016 it had 18,070 passengers in January and 57,302 in July. During the Almedalen Week the airport is slot coordinated.

History 

Seaplanes were used for public flights to Gotland from 1925, landing in a sheltered bay near Slite, or in Lake Tingstäde.

Visby Airport was opened on 27 January 1942. The first aircraft to land was a Junkers Ju 52/3m named Göteland from AB Aerotransport. In October the same year regular traffic between Visby and the Swedish mainland started, in the beginning mostly with Ju 52s. In 1958 a new terminal building, a new control tower and a new runway made of asphalt was inaugurated. A runway which also featured a railway crossing. The current terminal and control tower opened in 1985.

Airlines and destinations

Passenger

Cargo

Statistics

Military significance 
The airport has been used for military activities from its opening in 1942, although not as a proper airbase, but as a detachment used by a mainland airbase. The airport has the only long runway on Gotland. Gotland and the airport is important in the event of a need to defend an attack on NATO members Estonia, Latvia and Lithuania.

Other aviation 
Apart from the commercial aviation at Visby airport, there is also a flying club and a parachuting club based at the airport. And the Swedish Maritime Administration has a search and rescue helicopter based in Visby.

Unusual railroad crossing 

Before the railroad was closed down on the island of Gotland, the main line from Visby to the northern parts of the island actually crossed the runway. It was one of the few airports in the world where this happened.
 The railway traffic was ended in 1960 and the tracks removed a few years later.

See also 
List of the largest airports in the Nordic countries

References

External links 

Airports in Sweden
Visby
Buildings and structures in Gotland County
Swedish Air Force
Airports established in 1942
1942 establishments in Sweden
International airports in Sweden